John McGuinness (born 17 May 1967) is an English lawn bowler. He competed in the men's fours at the 2014 Commonwealth Games where he won a silver medal.

References

1967 births
Living people
Bowls players at the 2014 Commonwealth Games
Commonwealth Games silver medallists for England
English male bowls players
Commonwealth Games medallists in lawn bowls
Medallists at the 2014 Commonwealth Games